St. John is a town in Lake County, Indiana, United States. The town of St. John has homes in St. John Township, Hanover Township, and Center Township. St. John was founded in 1837. The population was 14,850 at the 2010 census.  In 2009, St. John ranked 48th among CNN's top 100 places to live in the United States. In 2014, St. John was ranked as the 4th safest place in Indiana by Movoto Real Estate.

History
The St. John post office was established in 1846. The town was named for John Hack, a pioneer settler.

St. John is home to the nationally known Shrine of Christ’s Passion, opened in 2008. An interactive display of the Passion of Christ, it contains 40 life-size statues depicting the time from the Agony in the Garden all the way to the Resurrection. It has attracted visitors from all 50 states and more than 40 different countries. https://shrineofchristspassion.org

The Francis P. Keilman House was listed in the National Register of Historic Places in 2013.

Geography

Demographics

2010 census
As of the census of 2010, there were 14,850 people, 5,047 households, and 4,225 families living in the town. The racial makeup of the town was 93.5% White, 1.3% African American, 0.1% Native American, 1.3% Asian, 0.1% Pacific Islander, 2.4% from other races, and 1.2% from two or more races. Hispanic or Latino of any race were 8.2% of the population.

There were 5,047 households, of which 40.2% had children under the age of 18 living with them, 75.5% were married couples living together, 5.6% had a female householder with no husband present, 2.6% had a male householder with no wife present, and 16.3% were non-families. 13.9% of all households were made up of individuals, and 6% had someone living alone who was 65 years of age or older. The average household size was 2.94 and the average family size was 3.25.

The median age in the town was 40.2 years. 27.3% of residents were under the age of 18; 6.3% were between the ages of 18 and 24; 23.6% were from 25 to 44; 31.2% were from 45 to 64; and 11.3% were 65 years of age or older. The gender makeup of the town was 49.9% male and 50.1% female.

2000 census
As of the census of 2000, there were 8,382 people, 2,800 households, and 2,441 families living in the town. The racial makeup of the town was 91.55% White, 0.13% African American, 0.17% Native American, 0.47% Asian, 0.75% from other races, and 0.93% from two or more races. Hispanic or Latino of any race were 4.20% of the population.

There were 2,800 households, out of which 43.3% had children under the age of 18 living with them, 79.8% were married couples living together, 5.1% had a female householder with no husband present, and 12.8% were non-families. 11.1% of all households were made up of individuals, and 4.9% had someone living alone who was 65 years of age or older. The average household size was 2.99 and the average family size was 3.24.

In the town, the population was spread out, with 28.4% under the age of 18, 6.5% from 18 to 24, 28.3% from 25 to 44, 28.0% from 45 to 64, and 8.9% who were 65 years of age or older. The median age was 39 years. For every 100 females, there were 100.9 males. For every 100 females age 18 and over, there were 98.0 males.

The median income for a household in the town was $71,378, and the median income for a family was $75,231. Males had a median income of $55,554 versus $30,603 for females. The per capita income for the town was $25,106. About 1.1% of families and 1.7% of the population were below the poverty line, including 0.9% of those under age 18 and 2.9% of those age 65 or over.

Education
St. John is served mostly by the Lake Central School Corporation (north of 101st Ave and west of Cline Ave), the Hanover Community School Corporation (south of 101st Ave and west of Cline Ave), and the Crown Point Community School Corporation (south of 101st Ave and east of Cline Ave). Three of the ten Lake Central schools are located in Saint John. These include:
 Lake Central High School
 Kolling Elementary School
 Clark Middle School

In addition to public schools, the community is home to a variety of private schools including St. John Evangelist School, a Roman Catholic School serving grades K-8 and Crown Point Christian School, an evangelical school headed by a parent-owned association. Alongside Crown Point Christian School, Illiana Christian High School is an evangelical high school in the town. Many other residents attend for high school studies: Andrean High School (Merrillville), Bishop Noll Institute (Hammond), Marian Catholic High School (Chicago Heights, IL) and Mount Carmel High School (Chicago, IL).

Notable residents 
John Kass, a columnist and radio broadcaster who comments on Chicago and Illinois politics, lives in Saint John.

References

External links
 Town of St. John, Indiana website
 https://shrineofchristspassion.org/

Towns in Lake County, Indiana
Towns in Indiana
Populated places established in 1837
1837 establishments in Indiana